The elm cultivar Ulmus 'Alksuth' was first mentioned by Dieck, (Zöschen, Germany) in Haupt-catalog der Obst- und gehölzbaumschulen des ritterguts Zöschen bei Merseburg, p. 81, 1885 as Ulmus scabra (: glabra) forma von Alksuth Hort..

Description
Described as having acute-rounded leaves, with a number of sometimes almost thread-like teeth. Considered "possibly Ulmus carpinifolia" (:minor).

Cultivation
No specimens are known to survive.

References

Ulmus articles missing images
Elm cultivars
Missing elm cultivars